Puzzle Shock! is the second studio album by the Serbian hip-hop artist Marčelo. Released in 2005, the 16-track album features various artists from Serbia and Croatia performing in different music styles, including pop and rock/rock 'n' roll.  The album improved on the success of Marčelo's debut album De Facto.

Track listing

Other
"Sve Oke" includes an introduction with scratching by DJ Raid.
"Nedođija BB" was remade and re-edited for the album. The original version was released in 2003. on the compilation/mixtape album "Ulice Vol. 1".

References

2005 albums
Marčelo albums